Tozaki Dam  is a gravity dam located in Miyazaki Prefecture in Japan. The dam is used for power production. The catchment area of the dam is 324.3 km2. The dam impounds about 16  ha of land when full and can store 544 thousand cubic meters of water. The construction of the dam was started on 1939 and completed in 1943.

See also
List of dams in Japan
List of dams in Miyazaki Prefecture

References

Dams in Miyazaki Prefecture